C'est La Vie is the seventh studio album by Phosphorescent. The album was released on Dead Oceans on October 5, 2018.

Release
On July 30, 2018, Matthew Houck - under his stage name Phosphorescent - announced the release of his seventh album, along with the first single "New Birth in New England".

Critical reception
C'est La Vie was met with "generally favorable" reviews from critics. At Metacritic, which assigns a weighted average rating out of 100 to reviews from mainstream publications, this release received an average score of 80 based on 19 reviews. Aggregator Album of the Year gave the release a 76 out of 100 based on a critical consensus of 21 reviews.

Track listing

Charts

Personnel
Credits adapted from AllMusic

Musicians
 Matthew Houck – primary artist, vocals, producer
 Ricky Ray Jackson – guitar
 Luke Reynolds – guitar
 Christopher Marine – drums
 Kevin Black – bass
 Jo Schornikow – accordion, piano
 Scott Stapleton – piano
 Dave Roe – bass
 Rustine Bragaw – bass
 Alexis Saski – backing vocals
 Maureen Murphy – backing vocals
 Kyshona Armstrong – backing vocals
 Nicole Boggs – backing vocals

Production
 Richard Dodd – mastering
 Vance Powell – engineer
 Andrija Tokic – engineer

References

Phosphorescent (band) albums
2018 albums
Dead Oceans albums